This article presents a list of commands used by DOS operating systems, especially as used on x86-based IBM PC compatibles (PCs). Other DOS operating systems are not part of the scope of this list.

In DOS, many standard system commands were provided for common tasks such as listing files on a disk or moving files.  Some commands were built into the command interpreter, others existed as external commands on disk. Over the several generations of DOS, commands were added for the additional functions of the operating system. In the current Microsoft Windows operating system, a text-mode command prompt window, cmd.exe, can still be used.

Command processing
The command interpreter for DOS runs when no application programs are running. When an application exits, if the transient portion of the command interpreter in memory was overwritten, DOS will reload it from disk. Some commands are internal—built into COMMAND.COM; others are external commands stored on disk. When the user types a line of text at the operating system command prompt, COMMAND.COM will parse the line and attempt to match a command name to a built-in command or to the name of an executable program file or batch file on disk. If no match is found, an error message is printed, and the command prompt is refreshed.

External commands were too large to keep in the command processor, or were less frequently used. Such utility programs would be stored on disk and loaded just like regular application programs but were distributed with the operating system. Copies of these utility command programs had to be on an accessible disk, either on the current drive or on the command path set in the command interpreter.

In the list below, commands that can accept more than one file name, or a filename including wildcards (* and ?), are said to accept a filespec (file specification) parameter. Commands that can accept only a single file name are said to accept a filename parameter. Additionally, command line switches, or other parameter strings, can be supplied on the command line. Spaces and symbols such as a "/" or a "-" may be used to allow the command processor to parse the command line into filenames, file specifications, and other options.

The command interpreter preserves the case of whatever parameters are passed to commands, but the command names themselves and file names are case-insensitive.

Many commands are the same across many DOS systems, but some differ in command syntax or name.

DOS commands
A partial list of the most common commands for MS-DOS and IBM PC DOS follows below.

APPEND
Sets the path to be searched for data files or displays the current search path. 
The APPEND command is similar to the PATH command that tells DOS where to search for program files (files with a .COM, . EXE, or .BAT file name extension).

The command is available in MS-DOS versions 3.2 and later.

ASSIGN

The command redirects requests for disk operations on one drive to a different drive. It can also display drive assignments or reset all drive letters to their original assignments.

The command is available in MS-DOS versions 3 through 5 and IBM PC DOS releases 2 through 5.

ATMDM 
Lists connections and addresses seen by Windows ATM call manager.

ATTRIB

Attrib changes or views the attributes of one or more files. It defaults to display the attributes of all files in the current directory. The file attributes available include read-only, archive, system, and hidden attributes. The command has the capability to process whole folders and subfolders of files and also process all files.

The command is available in MS-DOS versions 3 and later.

BACKUP and RESTORE
These are commands to backup and restore files from an external disk. These appeared in version 2, and continued to PC DOS 5 and MS-DOS 6 (PC DOS 7 had a deversioned check). In DOS 6, these were replaced by commercial programs (CPBACKUP, MSBACKUP), which allowed files to be restored to different locations.

BASIC and BASICA

An implementation of the BASIC programming language for PCs. Implementing BASIC in this way was very common in operating systems on 8- and 16-bit machines made in the 1980s.

IBM computers had BASIC 1.1 in ROM, and IBM's versions of BASIC used code in this ROM-BASIC, which allowed for extra memory in the code area.  BASICA last appeared in IBM PC DOS 5.02, and in OS/2 (2.0 and later), the version had ROM-BASIC moved into the program code.

Microsoft released GW-BASIC for machines with no ROM-BASIC.  Some OEM releases had basic.com and basica.com as loaders for GW-BASIC.EXE.

BASIC was dropped after MS-DOS 4, and PC DOS 5.02.  OS/2 (which uses PC DOS 5), has it, while MS-DOS 5 does not.

BREAK

The command is available in MS-DOS versions 2 and later.

CALL

Starts a batch file from within another batch file and returns when that one ends.

The command is available in MS-DOS versions 3.3 and later.

CD and CHDIR

The CHDIR (or the alternative name CD) command either displays or changes the current working directory.

The command is available in MS-DOS versions 2 and later.

CHCP
The command either displays or changes the active code page used to display character glyphs in a console window. Similar functionality can be achieved with MODE CON: CP SELECT=.

The command is available in MS-DOS versions 3.3 and later.

CHKDSK

CHKDSK verifies a storage volume (for example, a hard disk, disk partition or floppy disk) for file system integrity. The command has the ability to fix errors on a volume and recover information from defective disk sectors of a volume.

The command is available in MS-DOS versions 1 and later.

CHOICE

The CHOICE command is used in batch files to prompt the user to select one item from a set of single-character choices. Choice was introduced as an external command with MS-DOS 6.0; Novell DOS 7 and PC DOS 7.0. Earlier versions of DR-DOS supported this function with the built-in switch command (for numeric choices) or by beginning a command with a question mark. This command was formerly called ync (yes-no-cancel).

CLS

The CLS or CLRSCR command clears the terminal screen.

The command is available in MS-DOS versions 2 and later.

COMMAND

Start a new instance of the command interpreter.

The command is available in MS-DOS versions 1 and later.

COMP

Show differences between any two files, or any two sets of files.

The command is available in MS-DOS versions 3.3 through 5 and IBM PC DOS releases 1 through 5.

COPY

Makes copies of existing files.

The command is available in MS-DOS versions 1 and later.

CTTY
Defines the terminal device (for example, COM1) to use for input and output.

The command is available in MS-DOS versions 2 and later.

DATE
Displays the system date and prompts the user to enter a new date. Complements the TIME command.

The command is available in MS-DOS versions 1 and later.

DBLBOOT

(Not a command: This is a batch file added to DOS 6.X Supplemental Disks to help create DoubleSpace boot floppies.)

DBLSPACE

A disk compression utility supplied with MS-DOS version 6.0 (released in 1993) and version 6.2.

DEBUG

A very primitive assembler and disassembler.

DEFRAG

The command has the ability to analyze the file fragmentation on a disk drive or to defragment a drive. This command is called DEFRAG in MS-DOS/PC DOS and diskopt in DR-DOS.

The command is available in MS-DOS versions 6 and later.

DEL and ERASE

DEL (or the alternative form ERASE) is used to delete one or more files.

The command is available in MS-DOS versions 1 and later.

DELTREE

Deletes a directory along with all of the files and subdirectories that it contains. Normally, it will ask for confirmation of the potentially dangerous action. Since the RD (RMDIR) command can not delete a directory if the directory is not empty (except in Windows NT & 10), the DELTREE command can be used to delete the whole directory.

The deltree command is included in certain versions of Microsoft Windows and MS-DOS operating systems. It is specifically available only in versions of MS-DOS 6.0 and higher, and in Microsoft Windows 9x. This command is not present in Windows 7 and 8.

DIR

The DIR command displays the contents of a directory. The contents comprise the disk's volume label and serial number; one directory or filename per line, including the filename extension, the file size in bytes, and the date and time the file was last modified; and the total number of files listed, their cumulative size, and the free space (in bytes) remaining on the disk. The command is one of the few commands that exist from the first versions of DOS. The command can display files in subdirectories. The resulting directory listing can be sorted by various criteria and filenames can be displayed in a chosen format.

DISKCOMP

A command for comparing the complete contents of a floppy disk to another one.

The command is available in MS-DOS versions 3.2 and later and IBM PC DOS releases 1 and later.

DISKCOPY

A command for copying the complete contents of a diskette to another diskette.

The command is available in MS-DOS versions 2 and later.

DOSKEY

A command that adds command history, macro functionality, and improved editing features to the command-line interpreter.

The command is available in MS-DOS versions 5 and later.

DOSSIZE

Displays how much memory various DOS components occupy.

DRVSPACE

A disk compression utility supplied with MS-DOS version 6.22.

ECHO

The ECHO command prints its own arguments back out to the DOS equivalent of the standard output stream. (Hence the name, ECHO) Usually, this means directly to the screen, but the output of echo can be redirected, like any other command, to files or devices. Often used in batch files to print text out to the user.

Another important use of the echo command is to toggle echoing of commands on and off in batch files. Traditionally batch files begin with the @echo off statement. This says to the interpreter that echoing of commands should be off during the whole execution of the batch file, thus resulting in a "tidier" output (the @ symbol declares that this particular command (echo off) should also be executed without echo.)

The command is available in MS-DOS versions 2 and later.

EDIT

EDIT is a full-screen text editor, included with MS-DOS versions 5 and 6, OS/2 and Windows NT to 4.0 The corresponding program in Windows 95 and later, and Windows 2000 and later is Edit v2.0. PC DOS 6 and later use the DOS E Editor and DR-DOS used editor up to version 7.

EDLIN

DOS line-editor.  It can be used with a script file, like debug, this makes it of some use even today.  The absence of a console editor in MS-DOS/PC DOS 1–4 created an after-market for third-party editors.

In DOS 5, an extra command "?" was added to give the user much-needed help.

DOS 6 was the last version to contain EDLIN; for MS-DOS 6, it's on the supplemental disks, while PC DOS 6 had it in the base install. Windows NT 32-bit, and OS/2 have Edlin.

EMM386

The EMM386 command enables or disables EMM386 expanded-memory support on a computer with an 80386 or higher processor.

The command is available in MS-DOS versions 5 and later.

ERASE 
See: DEL and ERASE

EXE2BIN

Converts an executable (.exe) file into a binary file with the extension .com, which is a memory image of the program.

The size of the resident code and data sections combined in the input .exe file must be less than 64 KB. The file must also have no stack segment.

The command is available in MS-DOS versions 1 through 5. It is available separately for version 6 on the Supplemental Disk.

EXIT

Exits the current command processor.  If the exit is used at the primary command, it has no effect unless in a DOS window under Microsoft Windows, in which case the window is closed and the user returns to the desktop.

The command is available in MS-DOS versions 2 and later.

EXPAND
The Microsoft File Expansion Utility is used to uncompress one or more compressed cabinet files (.CAB). The command dates back to 1990 and was supplied on floppy disc for MS-DOS versions 5 and later.

FAKEMOUS

FAKEMOUS is an IBM PS/2 mouse utility used with AccessDOS. It is included on the MS-DOS 6 Supplemental Disk.
AccessDOS assists persons with disabilities.

FASTHELP

Provides information for MS-DOS commands.

FASTOPEN

A command that provides accelerated access to frequently-used files and directories.

The command is available in MS-DOS versions 3.3 and later.

FC

Show differences between any two files, or any two sets of files.

The command is available in MS-DOS versions 2 and later – primarily non-IBM releases.

FDISK

The FDISK command manipulates hard disk partition tables. The name derives from IBM's habit of calling hard drives fixed disks. FDISK has the ability to display information about, create, and delete DOS partitions or logical DOS drive. It can also install a standard master boot record on the hard drive.

The command is available in MS-DOS versions 3.2 and later and IBM PC DOS 2.0 releases and later.

FIND

The FIND command is a filter to find lines in the input data stream that contain or don't contain a specified string and send these to the output data stream. It may also be used as a pipe.

The command is available in MS-DOS versions 2 and later.

FINDSTR
The FINDSTR command is a GREP-oriented FIND-like utility. Among its uses is the logical-OR lacking in FIND.

would find all TXT files with one or more of the above-listed words YES, NO, MAYBE.

FOR

Iteration: repeats a command for each out of a specified set of files.
The FOR loop can be used to parse a file or the output of a command.

The command is available in MS-DOS versions 2 and later.

FORMAT

Deletes the FAT entries and the root directory of the drive/partition, and reformats it for MS-DOS. In most cases, this should only be used on floppy drives or other removable media. This command can potentially erase everything on a computer's drive.

The command is available in MS-DOS versions 1 and later.

GOTO

The Goto command transfers execution to a specified label. Labels are specified at the beginning of a line, with a colon.

The command is available in MS-DOS versions 2 and later.

Used in Batch files.

GRAFTABL

The GRAFTABL command enables the display of an extended character set in graphics mode.

The command is available in MS-DOS versions 3 through 5.

GRAPHICS
A TSR program to enable the sending of graphical screen dump to printer by pressing <Print Screen>.

The command is available in MS-DOS versions 3.2 and later and IBM PC DOS releases 2 and later.

HELP

Gives help about DOS commands.

The command is available in MS-DOS versions 5 thru Windows XP. Full-screen command help is available in MS-DOS versions 6 and later. Beginning with Windows XP, the command processor "DOS" offers builtin-help for commands by using  (e.g. )

IF

IF is a conditional statement, that allows branching of the program execution. It evaluates the specified condition, and only if it is true, then it executes the remainder of the command line. Otherwise, it skips the remainder of the line and continues with next command line.

Used in Batch files.

The command is available in MS-DOS versions 2 and later.

INTERSVR and INTERLNK
In MS-DOS; filelink in DR-DOS.

Network PCs using a null modem cable or LapLink cable. The server-side version of InterLnk, it also immobilizes the machine it's running on as it is an active app (As opposed to a terminate-and-stay-resident program) which must be running for any transfer to take place. DR-DOS' filelink is executed on both the client and server.

New in PC DOS 5.02, MS-DOS 6.0.

JOIN
The JOIN command attaches a drive letter to a specified directory on another drive. The opposite can be achieved via the SUBST command.

The command is available in MS-DOS versions 3 through 5. It is available separately for versions 6.2 and later on the Supplemental Disk.

KEYB
The KEYB command is used to select a keyboard layout.

The command is available in MS-DOS versions 3.3 and later.

From DOS 3.0 through 3.21, there are instead per-country commands, namely KEYBFR, KEYBGR, KEYBIT, KEYBSP and KEYBUK.

LABEL

Changes the label on a logical drive, such as a hard disk partition or a floppy disk.

The command is available in MS-DOS versions 3.1 and later and IBM PC DOS releases 3 and later.

LINK4

Microsoft 8086 Object Linker

LOADFIX 
Loads a program above the first 64K of memory, and runs the program. The command is available in MS-DOS versions 5 and later. It is included only in MS-DOS/PC DOS. DR-DOS used memmax, which opened or closed lower, upper, and video memory access, to block the lower 64K of memory.

LOADHIGH and LH 

A command that loads a program into the upper memory area.

The command is available in MS-DOS versions 5 and later.

It is called hiload in DR-DOS.

MD or MKDIR 

Makes a new directory. The parent of the directory specified will be created if it does not already exist.

The command is available in MS-DOS versions 2 and later.

MEM 
Displays memory usage. It is capable of displaying program size and status, memory in use, and internal drivers. It is an external command.

The command is available in MS-DOS versions 4 and later and DR DOS releases 5.0 and later.

On earlier DOS versions the memory usage could be shown by running CHKDSK. In DR DOS the parameter /A could be used to only show the memory usage.

MEMMAKER 
Starting with version 6, MS-DOS included the external program MemMaker which was used to free system memory (especially Conventional memory) by automatically reconfiguring the AUTOEXEC.BAT and CONFIG.SYS files. This was usually done by moving TSR programs and device drivers to the upper memory. The whole process required two system restarts. Before the first restart the user was asked whether to enable EMS Memory, since use of expanded memory required a reserved 64KiB region in upper memory. The first restart inserted the SIZER.EXE program which gauged the memory needed by each TSR or Driver. MemMaker would then calculate the optimal Driver and TSR placement in upper memory and modify the AUTOEXEC.BAT and CONFIG.SYS accordingly, and reboot the second time.

MEMMAKER.EXE and SIZER.EXE were developed for Microsoft by Helix Software Company and were eliminated starting in MS-DOS 7 (Windows 95); however, they could be obtained from Microsoft's FTP server as part of the OLDDOS.EXE package, alongside other tools.

PC DOS uses another program called RamBoost to optimize memory, working either with PC DOS's HIMEM/EMM386 or a third-party memory manager. RamBoost was licensed to IBM by Central Point Software.

MIRROR 

The MIRROR command saves disk storage information that can be used to recover accidentally erased files.

The command is available in MS-DOS version 5. It is available separately for versions 6.2 and later on Supplemental Disk.

MODE 
Configures system devices. Changes graphics modes, adjusts keyboard settings, prepares code pages, and sets up port redirection.

The command is available in MS-DOS versions 3.2 and later and IBM PC DOS releases 1 and later.

MORE 

The MORE command paginates text, so that one can view files containing more than one screen of text. More may also be used as a filter. While viewing MORE text, the return key displays the next line, the space bar displays the next page.

The command is available in MS-DOS versions 2 and later.

MOVE 

Moves files or renames directories.

The command is available in MS-DOS versions 6 and later.

DR-DOS used a separate command for renaming directories, rendir.

MSAV 

A command that scans the computer for known viruses.

The command is available in MS-DOS versions 6 and later.

MSBACKUP
The MSBACKUP command is used to backup or restore one or more files from one disk to another.

The New York Times said that MSBACKUP "is much better and faster than the old BACKUP command used in earlier versions of DOS, but it does lack some of the advanced features found in backup software packages that are sold separately. There is another offering, named MWBACKUP, that is GUI-oriented. It was introduced for Windows for Workgroups (3.11).

The MSBACKUP command is available in MS-DOS versions 6 and later.

MSCDEX

MSCDEX is a driver executable which allows DOS programs to recognize, read, and control CD-ROMs.

The command is available in MS-DOS versions 6 and later.

MSD

The MSD command provides detailed technical information about the computer's hardware and software. MSD was new in MS-DOS 6; the PC DOS version of this command is QCONFIG.  The command appeared first in Word2, and then in Windows 3.10.

MSHERC 

The MSHERC.COM (also QBHERC.COM) was a TSR graphics driver supplied with Microsoft QuickC, QuickBASIC, and the C Compiler, to allow use of the Hercules adapter high-resolution graphics capability (720 x 348, 2 colors).

NLSFUNC 

Loads extended Nationalization and Localization Support from COUNTRY.SYS, and changed the codepage of drivers and system modules resident in RAM.

In later versions of DR-DOS 6, NLSFUNC relocated itself into the HiMem area, thereby freeing a portion of the nearly invaluable lower 640KiB that constituted the ”conventional” memory available to software.

The command is available in MS-DOS versions 3.3 and later.

PATH

Displays or sets a search path for executable files.

The command is available in MS-DOS versions 2 and later.

PAUSE
Suspends processing of a batch program and displays the message , if not given other text to display.

The command is available in MS-DOS versions 1 and later.

PING 

Allows the user to test the availability of a network connection to a specified host. Hostnames are usually resolved to IP addresses.

It is not included in many DOS versions; typically ones with network stacks will have it as a diagnostic tool.

POWER

The POWER command is used to turn power management on and off, report the status of power management, and set levels of power conservation. It is an external command implemented as POWER.EXE.

The command is available in MS-DOS versions 6 and later.

PRINT 

The PRINT command adds or removes files in the print queue. This command was introduced in MS-DOS version 2. Before that there was no built-in support for background printing files. The user would usually use the copy command to copy files to LPT1.

PRINTFIX

PROMPT 

The  command allows the user to change the prompt in the command screen. , displays the current system date as the prompt. Type  in the cmd screen for help on this function.

The command is available in MS-DOS versions 2 and later and IBM PC DOS releases 2.1 and later.

PS

A utility inspired by the UNIX/XENIX ps command. It also provides a full-screen mode, similar to the top utility on UNIX systems.

QBASIC 

An integrated development environment and BASIC interpreter.

The command is available in MS-DOS versions 5 and later.

RD or RMDIR 

Remove a directory (delete a directory); by default the directories must be empty of files for the command to succeed.

The command is available in MS-DOS versions 2 and later.

The deltree command in some versions of MS-DOS and all versions of Windows 9x removes non-empty directories.

RECOVER 

A primitive filesystem error recovery utility included in MS-DOS / IBM PC DOS.

The command is available in MS-DOS versions 2 through 5.

REM 
Remark (comment) command, normally used within a batch file, and for DR-DOS, PC/MS-DOS 6 and above, in CONFIG.SYS. This command is processed by the command processor. Thus, its output can be redirected to create a zero-byte file. REM is useful in logged sessions or screen-captures. One might add comments by way of labels, usually starting with double-colon.   These are not processed by the command processor.

REN 

The REN command renames a file. Unlike the move command, this command cannot be used to rename subdirectories, or rename files across drives. Mass renames can be accomplished by the use of the wildcards characters asterisk (*) and question mark (?).

The command is available in MS-DOS versions 1 and later.

REPLACE 

A command that is used to replace one or more existing computer files or add new files to a target directory.

The command is available in MS-DOS versions 3.2 and later.

RESTORE 
See: BACKUP and RESTORE

SCANDISK 

Disk diagnostic utility. Scandisk was a replacement for the chkdsk utility, starting with MS-DOS version 6.2 and later. Its primary advantages over chkdsk is that it is more reliable and has the ability to run a surface scan which finds and marks bad clusters on the disk. It also provided mouse point-and-click TUI, allowing for interactive session to complement command-line batch run.
chkdsk had surface scan and bad cluster detection functionality included, and was used again on Windows NT-based operating systems.

SELECT 

The SELECT command formats a disk and installs country-specific information and keyboard codes.
It was initially only available with IBM PC DOS. The version included with PC DOS 3.0 and 3.1 is hard-coded to transfer the operating system from A: to B:, while from PC DOS 3.2 onward you can specify the source and destination, and can be used to install DOS to the harddisk.

The version included with MS-DOS 4 and PC DOS 4 is no longer a simple command-line utility, but a full-fledged installer.

The command is available in MS-DOS versions 3.3 and 4 and IBM PC DOS releases 3 through 4.

This command is no longer included in DOS Version 5 and later, where it has been replaced by SETUP.

SET 
Sets environment variables.

The command is available in MS-DOS versions 2 and later.

cmd.exe in Windows NT 2000, 4DOS, 4OS2, 4NT, and a number of third-party solutions allow direct entry of environment variables from the command prompt. From at least Windows 2000, the set command allows for the evaluation of strings into variables, thus providing inter alia a means of performing integer arithmetic.

SETUP 

The command is available in MS-DOS versions 5 and later.
This command does a computer setup. With all computers running DOS versions 5 and
later, it runs the computer setup, such as Windows 95 setup and Windows 98 setup.

SETVER 

SetVer is a TSR program designed to return a different value to the version of DOS that is running.  This allows programs that look for a specific version of DOS to run under a different DOS.

The command is available in MS-DOS versions 5 and later.

SHARE 

Installs support for file sharing and locking capabilities.

The command is available in MS-DOS versions 3 and later.

SHIFT 
The SHIFT command increases number of replaceable parameters to more than the standard ten for use in batch files.
This is done by changing the position of replaceable parameters.

The command is available in MS-DOS versions 2 and later.

SIZER 

The external command SIZER.EXE is not intended to be started directly from the command prompt. Is used by MemMaker during the memory-optimization process.

SMARTDRV 

The command is available in MS-DOS versions 6 and later.

SORT 
A filter to sort lines in the input data stream and send them to the output data stream. Similar to the Unix command sort. Handles files up to 64k. This sort is always case insensitive.

The command is available in MS-DOS versions 2 and later.

SUBST 

A utility to map a subdirectory to a drive letter. The opposite can be achieved via the JOIN command.

The command is available in MS-DOS versions 3.1 and later.

SYS 

A utility to make a volume bootable.  Sys rewrites the Volume Boot Code (the first sector of the partition that SYS is acting on) so that the code, when executed, will look for IO.SYS.  SYS also copies the core DOS system files, IO.SYS, MSDOS.SYS, and COMMAND.COM, to the volume.  SYS does not rewrite the Master Boot Record, contrary to widely held belief.

The command is available in MS-DOS versions 1 and later.

TELNET 
The Telnet Client is a tool for developers and administrators to help manage and test network connectivity.

TIME 

Display the system time and waits for the user to enter a new time.  Complements the DATE command.

The command is available in MS-DOS versions 1 and later.

TITLE

Enables a user to change the title of their MS-DOS window.

TREE 

It is an external command, graphically displays the path of each directory and sub-directories on the specified drive.

The command is available in MS-DOS versions 3.2 and later and IBM PC DOS releases 2 and later.

TRUENAME 
Internal command that expands the name of a file, directory, or drive, and display its absolute pathname as the result. It will expand relative pathnames, SUBST drives, and JOIN directories, to find the actual directory.
 
For example, in DOS 7.1, if the current directory is C:\WINDOWS\SYSTEM, then

The argument does not need to refer to an existing file or directory: TRUENAME will output the absolute pathname as if it did. Also TRUENAME does not search in the PATH.
For example, in DOS 5, if the current directory is C:\TEMP, then TRUENAME command.com will display C:\TEMP\COMMAND.COM (which does not exist), not C:\DOS\COMMAND.COM (which does and is in the PATH).

This command displays the UNC pathnames of mapped network or local CD drives. This command is an undocumented DOS command. The help switch "/?" defines it as a "Reserved command name". It is available in MS-DOS version 5.00 and later, including the DOS 7 and 8 in Windows 95/98/ME. The C library function realpath performs this function. The Microsoft Windows NT command processors do not support this command, including the versions of command.com for NT.

TYPE 

Displays a file. The more command is frequently used in conjunction with this command, e.g. type long-text-file | more. TYPE can be used to concatenate files; however this won't work for large files—use copy command instead.

The command is available in MS-DOS versions 1 and later.

UNDELETE 

Restores file previously deleted with del. By default all recoverable files in the working directory are restored; options are used to change this behavior. If the MS-DOS mirror TSR program is used, then deletion tracking files are created and can be used by undelete.

The command is available in MS-DOS versions 5 and later.

UNFORMAT 

MS-DOS version 5 introduced the quick format option (Format /Q) which removes the disk's file table without deleting any of the data. The same version also introduced the UNFORMAT command to undo the effects of a quick format, restoring the file table and making all the files accessible again. It is important to note that UNFORMAT only works if invoked before any further changes have overwritten the drive's contents.

VER 

An internal DOS command, that reports the DOS version presently running, and since MS-DOS 5, whether DOS is loaded high.

The command is available in MS-DOS versions 2 and later.

VERIFY 
Enables or disables the feature to determine if files have been correctly written to disk. If no parameter is provided, the command will display the current setting.

The command is available in MS-DOS versions 2 and later.

VOL 

An internal command that displays the disk volume label and serial number.

The command is available in MS-DOS versions 2 and later.

VSAFE 

A TSR program that continuously monitors the computer for viruses.

The command is available in MS-DOS versions 6 and later.

XCOPY 

Copy entire directory trees. Xcopy is a version of the copy command that can move files and directories from one location to another.

XCOPY usage and attributes can be obtained by typing  in the DOS Command line.

The command is available in MS-DOS versions 3.2 and later.

See also 
 :Category:Windows commands
 Command-line interface
 List of CONFIG.SYS directives
 Timeline of DOS operating systems

References

Further reading

External links 

Command-Line Reference  : Microsoft TechNet Database "Command-Line Reference"
The MS-DOS 6 Technical Reference on TechNet contains the official Microsoft MS-DOS 6 command reference documention.
DR-DOS 7.03 online manual 
MDGx MS-DOS Undocumented + Hidden Secrets

There are several guides to DOS commands available that are licensed under the GNU Free Documentation License:
The FreeDOS Spec at SourceForge is a plaintext specification, written in 1999, for how DOS commands should work in FreeDOS
MS-DOS commands
Reference for windows commands with examples
A Collection of Undocumented and Obscure Features in Various MS-DOS Versions

DOS commands
DOS commands